Eric Nkansah Appiah (born December 12, 1974) is a Ghanaian athlete specializing in the 100 metres.

He is one of the current national record holders in 4 x 100 m relay with 38,12 seconds, achieved at the 1997 World Championships in Athens where the Ghanaian team finished fifth in the final.

Participating in the 2004 Summer Olympics, he achieved sixth place in his 100 metres heat, thus missing out on a placing in Round 2 of the event. He won a bronze medal at the 2006 African Championships

His personal best time is 10.00 seconds, first achieved in June 1999 in Nuremberg. The Ghanaian record currently belongs to Leonard Myles-Mills with 9.98 seconds.

References

External links
 
 

1974 births
Living people
Ghanaian male sprinters
Athletes (track and field) at the 1996 Summer Olympics
Athletes (track and field) at the 2004 Summer Olympics
Olympic athletes of Ghana
Fenerbahçe athletes
Athletes (track and field) at the 1994 Commonwealth Games
Athletes (track and field) at the 1998 Commonwealth Games
Athletes (track and field) at the 2002 Commonwealth Games
Athletes (track and field) at the 2006 Commonwealth Games
Commonwealth Games competitors for Ghana
World Athletics Championships athletes for Ghana
African Games gold medalists for Ghana
African Games medalists in athletics (track and field)
African Games silver medalists for Ghana
Athletes (track and field) at the 2003 All-Africa Games
20th-century Ghanaian people
21st-century Ghanaian people